Black Mill, (or Owthorne Mill ), Waxholme, is a local landmark in the hamlet of Waxholme close to the town of Withernsea on the east coast of Yorkshire.

A tower windmill, only the bottom half of the tower remains after the top was removed in the World Wars and used as a lookout over the North Sea.  There has been a windmill on the site since at least 1648.  The last record of it being a working mill is around 1900.

Tolkien Two Towers hypothesis 

During the first world war J. R. R. Tolkien was stationed for a time at Thirtle Bridge only a mile or so from Waxholme and Withernsea.  It is well documented that he found inspiration, created languages and wrote stories while in the area.  A book detailing the Tolkien Triangle in East Yorkshire contains many such references.  One of the most well documented inspirations relates to when Tolkien watched his wife Edith sing and dance in the woods adjacent to Roos church near where she stayed while Tolkien was stationed in East Yorkshire which gave him the inspiration for the Elven princess Lúthien Tinúviel.  A number of articles have been written based on the information in the book including 'Dreaming shires: how East Yorkshire shaped Tolkiens Middle-earth fantasy' and 'How East Yorkshire inspired the worlds of The Hobbit and Lord of the Rings'.

From Thirtle Bridge the lighthouse at Withernsea stands tall on the horizon less than 2 miles away.  The Black Mill at Waxholme, while not as tall, but sited halfway between the two has a strong influence on the view from Thirtle Bridge standing as it does on high ground.  These two 'towers' have been put forward as possible inspiration for Tolkiens The Two Towers.  There are other possibilities in the Midlands that have been put forward but these are the only two towers with distinct colouring similar to the descriptions in the book.

Notes

References 

Windmills in Yorkshire